Kathleen (Kate) Braid (born March 19, 1947) is a Canadian poet. Born in Calgary, Alberta, she was raised in Montreal, Quebec, and graduated from Mount Allison University. Her poems and personal essays have been widely printed and anthologized. She lives in Vancouver, British Columbia.

Awards and honours
Her poetry has won several awards including the Pat Lowther Award for best book of poetry by a Canadian woman and the Vancity Book Prize.

Bibliography
Poetry
 Covering Rough Ground (Polestar, 1991)
 To This Cedar Fountain (Polestar, 1995)
 Inward to the Bones: Georgia O'Keeffe's Journey with Emily Carr (Polestar, 1998)
 In Fine Form: The Canadian Book of Form Poetry (Polestar, 2005; Ed., with Sandy Shreve)
 A Well-Mannered Storm: The Glenn Gould Poems (Caitlin, 2008)
 Turning Left to the Ladies (Palimpsest, 2009)

Poetry Chapbooks
 Small Songs (Hawthorne Society, 1994)
 A Woman's Fingerprint ({m}Other Tongue Press, 1997)

Non-fiction
 Red Bait! Struggle of a Mine Mill Local with Al King (Kingbird, 1998)
 Emily Carr: Rebel Artist (2000)
 The Fish Come In Dancing: Stories from the West-Coast Fishery (Ed., Strawberry Hill, 2002)

References

1947 births
Living people
20th-century Canadian poets
21st-century Canadian poets
Canadian women poets
Mount Allison University alumni
20th-century Canadian women writers
21st-century Canadian women writers
Writers from Calgary
Writers from Montreal
Writers from Vancouver